Kamil Jacek Glik (born 3 February 1988) is a Polish professional footballer who plays as a centre-back for Serie B club Benevento and the Poland national team.

The previous clubs Glik played for include Piast Gliwice from 2008 to 2010, Palermo from 2010 to 2011, Torino from 2011 to 2016 and Monaco from 2017 to 2020, the latter two of which he was appointed captain of the team. He represented Poland at UEFA Euro 2016, 2018 FIFA World Cup, Euro 2020 and the 2022 World Cup.

Early life
Kamil Glik's paternal grandfather, Walter Glück, was Upper Silesian, he was forcibly conscripted into the Wehrmacht. After the war, he stayed in what then became Poland. Glik therefore also holds German citizenship in addition to his Polish citizenship. In his German documents his surname is written out in German version Glück instead of the polonized version Glik. Despite this, Glik has repeatedly said that he does not feel any connection with Germany and considers himself 100% Polish. He has a daughter with his wife Marta, whom he had known since elementary school.

In 2013, Italian rapper Willie Peyote dedicated a song to him titled "Glik".

Club career

Early career
Glik began his career in the youth ranks of MOSiR Jastrzębie Zdrój and WSP Wodzisław Śląski, then moved on loan to LKS Silesia Lubomia. In 2006, he moved from WSP Wodzisław Śląski to Horadada in Spain, where he was noticed by Real Madrid and registered with the club's "C" team. He played there for two seasons, until 2008.

On 6 August 2008, he signed a four-year contract with Polish top division side Piast Gliwice. He made his debut on 30 August 2008, when he came on as a substitute. Subsequently, he became a regular in the team's starting eleven. He played 26 games in his first season with the club, and he scored 2 goals in 28 games in the 2009–10 season.

Palermo
At the end of the season it was reported that he had begun talks with Italian side U.S. Città di Palermo; on 7 July 2010 he signed with Sicilian club, who purchased him outright on a five-year contract. The transfer was finalised by the Lega Serie A after seven days.

He made his debut with the Rosaneri in the 2010–11 UEFA Europa League play-off round against Slovenia's Maribor (won 3–0), played as a starter. It was also his official debut in an international club competition. Following his debut he was almost never included in the first team, and until the winter break, only collected three more appearances in the group stage of the Europa League.

Bari (loan)
A few days before the official reopening of the transfer market, Palermo granted an exemption and allowed him to train – with a recovery date set for 28 December – with his new team, Bari. He moved to Bari until the end of season, strongly backed by the coach Giampiero Ventura. The contract was filed on 4 January 2011, and after the resumption of the league, 6 January, he was deployed as a starter in the Puglia derby, Lecce Bari (0–1), his debut in the Italian top division. With the Galletti he was a starter, playing 16 games in the league and one in Coppa Italia. In the 35th round, Bari Roma (2–3), he earnt a red card and a subsequent three-match ban which effectively concluded his season. He returned to Palermo, but was not called up for the summer retreat, and was then put on the market.

Torino

On 12 July 2011, after having already supported Torino's training camp, he transferred to Turin in a co-ownership deal, in Serie B, for €300,000.

He made his debut on 13 August in Torino Lumezzane, (1–0) in the second round of Coppa Italia, played as a starter. He scored his first goal in the 34th round, in the match Torino - Reggina, later suspended due to bad weather (the conclusion of the game did not change the result). At the end of the season, he was promoted to Serie A, having played 23 games in the league (with 2 goals) and one in Coppa Italia.

On 31 October 2012 he scored his first goal in Serie A in the tenth day of the league away to Lazio, opening the scoring with a header following a corner. The match finished 1–1. He played his first derby in the 2012–13 season, collecting two appearances and as many expulsions (the first player in the history of the league to be sent-off in both legs of a derby) and became an idol of the Torino fans. On 20 June, Torino acquired his remaining contract from Palermo for a fee of €1.5 million, resolving the co-ownership.

For the 2013–14 season, Glik was appointed captain of the team after the departure of Rolando Bianchi. On 9 December 2013, he scored the winning goal, 1–0, against Lazio, in Turin. He ended the season with 34 league appearances – which concluded with Torino's qualification to the UEFA Europa League after Parma failed to obtain a UEFA license – and two goals, plus an appearance in the Coppa Italia. On 25 May 2014, he renewed his contract until 2017.

On 31 July 2014, he made his debut with the Granata in international competition, playing the first leg of the third qualifying round of the UEFA Europa League, won 3–0 against the Swedes Brommapojkarna. On 24 September 2014, during an away fixture against Cagliari, he scored the momentary 1–1 in his hundredth game for Torino; Torino would win the match against the Sardinians 2–1.

On 21 December 2014, at the Stadio Olimpico in Turin, he scored his first brace in Serie A during a 2–1 comeback win over Genoa. On 10 January 2015, he scored the equaliser, 1–1, against Milan and on 1 March, he scored the winning goal, 1–0, against Napoli. On 19 March, he scored his first goal in the Europa League with a header during the round of 16 against Zenit Saint Petersburg. His goal brought Torino to 1–0, but not enough to overcome the 2 goal deficit from the first leg. On 5 April, he scored the second goal in a momentary 2–0 lead over Atalanta (the game would end 2–1). On 20 December 2015, he renewed with the Piedmontese club until 2020.

In total, he played 171 matches and scored 13 goals for Torino.

Monaco
On 4 July 2016, Glik was sold to Monaco for a reported fee of €11 million plus €4 million in bonuses, signing a four-year contract. In an official statement on the Torino website, the club stated "It has been five wonderful years, intense, full of emotions and mutual satisfaction. President Cairo and the whole Torino FC salute Glik with great affection, wishing him the best that his career can offer."

On 27 September 2016, Glik fired in a half-volley from the edge of the penalty box four minutes into second-half stoppage time to cancel out Javier Hernández's goal, enabling Monaco to snatch a 1–1 home draw in their 2016–17 UEFA Champions League Group E encounter against Bayer Leverkusen with their first and only shot on target of the match.

Glik played a main part in the Monaco side which won the 2016–17 Ligue 1 title making 36 appearances and scoring 6 goals.

Benevento
On 11 August 2020, newly promoted Serie A club Benevento announced the signing of Glik from Monaco on a three-year contract.

International career

Glik made 14 appearances and scored three goals for the Poland under-21. In 2010, he made his debut for the senior national team, after originally being called up without debuting in a game on 18 December 2009. Glik was the first Piast Gliwice player to ever be called up to Polish national team. He made his debut on 20 January 2010 in the King's Cup against Thailand, scoring 43 minutes into his debut, won 3–1.

On 17 October 2012, he scored the equalizing goal in a 2014 World Cup Qualifying game against England.

He played an important role in Poland's Euro 2016 qualifying campaign and Euro 2016 campaign. He made the most clearances out of any other player in the tournament, and scored 2 penalties in two penalty shoot-outs; one of them in a 5–4 win against Switzerland, and the other in a 5–3 defeat to eventual champions Portugal.

In June 2018, he became part of the Polish squad for the 2018 FIFA World Cup in Russia. In May 2021, he was included in the final squad for the postponed UEFA Euro 2020. However, Poland left the two competitions from the group stage.

On 10 November 2022, he received a call-up for the 2022 FIFA World Cup in Qatar. On 22 November, he played his 100th match for Poland, which was the first game in the World Cup against Mexico.

Style of play
Glik is a tall centre back with great physicality, but also good mobility; his biggest strength is undoubtedly his aerial ability, both in marking and on set pieces in the opposing area. He is also known for his leadership on the pitch.

Career statistics

Club

International

Scores and results list Poland's goal tally first, score column indicates score after each Glik goal.

Honours
Monaco
Ligue 1: 2016–17

Individual
UNFP Ligue 1 Team of the Year: 2016–17

References

External links

1988 births
Living people
Polish footballers
Polish people of German descent
Citizens of Germany through descent
UD Horadada players
Tercera División players
Piast Gliwice players
Ekstraklasa players
Real Madrid C footballers
Palermo F.C. players
S.S.C. Bari players
Torino F.C. players
AS Monaco FC players
Benevento Calcio players
Serie A players
Serie B players
Ligue 1 players
People from Jastrzębie-Zdrój
Poland under-21 international footballers
Poland international footballers
Polish expatriate footballers
Expatriate footballers in France
Expatriate footballers in Spain
Expatriate footballers in Monaco
Expatriate footballers in Italy
Polish expatriate sportspeople in France
Polish expatriate sportspeople in Spain
Polish expatriate sportspeople in Monaco
Polish expatriate sportspeople in Italy
Sportspeople from Silesian Voivodeship
Association football central defenders
UEFA Euro 2016 players
2018 FIFA World Cup players
UEFA Euro 2020 players
2022 FIFA World Cup players
FIFA Century Club